The NAIA World Series (officially branded as the Avista NAIA World Series for sponsorship purposes from 2013) is a double-elimination tournament, held since 1957, to determine the baseball champion of the National Association of Intercollegiate Athletics (NAIA). Since 2000, the tournament has been held at Harris Field on the campus of Lewis–Clark State College (LCSC) in Lewiston, Idaho, having previously hosted from 1984 to 1991.

History
A total of twelve cities have hosted the NAIA World Series. In 1957, the first edition of the series was held in Alpine, Texas, the home of inaugural champions, Sul Ross State. From 1984 to 1991 and since 2000, the series has been held in Lewiston on the campus of LCSC, the winningest school in the competition. The other cities who have hosted the tournament are Sioux City, Iowa; St. Joseph, Missouri; Phoenix, Arizona; Nashville, Tennessee; Lubbock, Texas; Des Moines, Iowa; Tulsa, Oklahoma; and Jupiter, Florida.

As of 2015, a total of 188 schools have competed in the tournament.

Results

Championships by team

 Schools highlighted in pink are closed or no longer sponsor athletics.
 Schools highlight in yellow have reclassified athletics from the NAIA.

See also
 NCAA Division I Baseball Championship
 NCAA Division II Baseball Championship
 NCAA Division III Baseball Championship
 NAIA Softball World Series

References

External links

 
1957 establishments in Texas
College baseball championships
Lewiston, Idaho
Recurring sporting events established in 1957
Sports in Idaho
Tourist attractions in Nez Perce County, Idaho
Sports competitions in Idaho